Mahathma Kabir is a 1962 Indian Kannada-language biographical film, directed by P. Srinivas and produced by T N Reddy on mystic saint Kabir Das. The film stars Rajkumar, Krishnakumari, Udaykumar and T. D. Kusalakumari. Telugu actor Sobhan Babu made a guest appearance in this movie which is his only Kannada movie. The movie had musical score by A.Anasuyadevi - making it the first instance of a female music director in Kannada cinema.

Cast

Rajkumar
Krishnakumari
Udaykumar
 T. D. Kusalakumari
Balakrishna
M. N. Lakshmidevi
M. Sathyanarayana
Desaraja Ramarao
Rajendra Krishna
Kashinath
Srikanth
Raghunandan
Mahalinga Bhagavathar
S. M. Veerabhadrappa
Hanumantha Rao
A. M. Shivaji
Bhujanga Rao
P. S. Mani
Sundar Rao
B. Jayashree
H. P. Saroja
Papamma
Sharada
Baby Chandrakala
Shobhan Babu in Guest appearance
Chi Sadashivaiah in Guest appearance
G. S. Narayan in Guest appearance
Suchithra in Guest appearance
Baby Seetha

References

External links
 

1962 films
1960s Kannada-language films